Wesele Cove is a cove between Boy Point and Low Head on the south coast of King George Island, South Shetland Islands. Named in 1980 by the Polish Antarctic Expedition after Wesele (The Wedding), a play by Polish dramatist Stanislaw Wyspianski (1869–1907).

References

Poland and the Antarctic
Coves of King George Island (South Shetland Islands)